Lobesia lithogonia is a moth of the family Tortricidae first described by Alexey Diakonoff in 1954. It is found in Thailand, Sri Lanka, Java, Borneo and New Guinea.

Description
The wingspan is 9–12 mm. The forewings are suffused with whitish ochreous, except for the edge of the markings, which are suffused with fuscous grey. The markings are tawny and more or less infuscated (darkened), and marked with dark fuscous brown. The hindwings are pale fuscous, with prismatic reflections, those in and beyond the cell are greenish. Its larval food plant is Eugenia densiflora.

References

Moths described in 1954
Olethreutini